Ross River-Southern Lakes was a territorial electoral district in Yukon. The district elected one member to the Yukon Legislative Assembly from 1992 to 2002.

At the 2002 election, the district was divided between Pelly-Nisutlin and Southern Lakes.

Members

Election results

1992 general election

|-

| Independent
| Willard Phelps
| align="right"|338
| align="right"|47.7
| align="right"|

| Yukon New Democratic Party
| Sam Johnston
| align="right"|234
| align="right"|33.0
| align="right"|

| Independent
| Timothy Cant
| align="right"|92
| align="right"|13.0
| align="right"|

| Yukon Liberal Party
| Jim Smarch
| align="right"|45
| align="right"|6.3
| align="right"|
|-
! align=left colspan=3|Total
! align=right|709
! align=right|100
|}

1996 general election

|-

| NDP
| Dave Keenan
| align="right"|484
| align="right"|56.9
| align="right"|

| Independent
| Willard Phelps
| align="right"|317
| align="right"|37.3
| align="right"|

| Liberal
| Bill Munroe
| align="right"|49
| align="right"|5.8
| align="right"|
|-
! align=left colspan=3|Total
! align=right|850
! align=right|100
|}

2000 general election

|-

| NDP
| Dave Keenan
| align="right"|357
| align="right"|51.4
| align="right"|

| Liberal
| Dorothy John
| align="right"|187
| align="right"|26.9
| align="right"|

| Yukon Party
| Ed Hall
| align="right"|150
| align="right"|21.6
| align="right"|
|-
! align=left colspan=3|Total
! align=right|694
! align=right|99.9
|}

Former Yukon territorial electoral districts